The Quatre poèmes hindous ("Four Hindu poems") are a cycle of mélodies by the French composer Maurice Delage for soprano and chamber ensemble of two flutes, oboe, two clarinets, harp, and string quartet.  Delage composed it in 1912 while he was visiting India.  It is considered his first masterwork, and it remains the best known and most recorded of his works.

Structure

Titles and dedications 

 Madras – "Une belle ..." (stanza 22 by Bhartṛhari), dedicated to Maurice Ravel
 Lahore – "Un sapin isolé ..." (poem by Heine)
 Bénarès – Naissance de Bouddha (anonymous), dédié à Florent Schmitt
 Jeypur – "Si vous pensez à elle ..." (stanza 73 by Bhartṛhari), dedicated to Igor Stravinsky.

The performance lasts just under nine minutes.

Composition

At the end of the French Third Republic, the Far East was in fashion in France, particularly in certain artistic circles.  The French composer Maurice Delage (1879–1961) travelled to British India at the end of 1911, largely funded by his father, who accompanied him.  The visit lasted until May 1913.  Delage named the mélodies he composed after the cities he was visiting when he composed them: Jaipur ("Jeypur"), Varanasi ("Bénarès"), Lahore, and Chennai ("Madras").

According to Philippe Rodriguez, the trip allowed the young composer to "reduce as much as possible an inferiority complex" he suffered from, despite ecouragement from Maurice Ravel, thanks to "the authenticity of an exoticism drawn from the source".  Rodriguez states the Quatre poèmes hindous represent "one of the first attempts to introduce the melodic and rhythmic forms of Indian music to the language of Western music".

Delage likely had a piano, as he felt himself unable to compose without a keyboard  He first made a version for soprano and piano and then magnified it with a rich harmonic instrumentation.  The technique of the instruments, all solo, is so exact that the harmonic instrumentation seems to have been specified very early.  The dates of composition are in the reverse order of the sequence of the mélodies: "Si vous pensez à elle ..." and Naissance de Bouddha  were completed in January 1912, "Un sapin isolé ..." in February, and "Une belle ..." in March.

Instrumentation

The instrumental formation is reduced effectively to chamber music, in which the piano is excluded.  Michel Duchesneau sees in this the influence of Schönberg's Pierrot Lunaire, which premièred in Vienna on 16 December 1912 and which motivated Ravel and Stravinsky to compose their own poems during 1913.  The work of Schönberg was also to have been included in the 1914 concert programme.  Alexis Roland-Manuel refuted this influence on Delage, while Marius Flothuis  sees the instrumental ensemble as closer to that which Ravel used in 1905 for his Introduction and Allegro, which is left to flute, clarinet, harp, and string quartet.

Première 
The première took place on 14 January 1914 at the inaugural concert of the Société musicale indépendante (SMI). It was performed by Rose Féart and was conducted by Désiré-Émile Inghelbrecht.  The premières of Florent Schmitt's Le Petit Elfe Ferme-l'œil, Ravel's Trois poèmes de Mallarmé, and Stravinsky's  took place at the same concert.

It was a great success for Delage, who was still largely unknown.  Émile Vuillermoz commented on both the score and the public reception: "These four mélodies deserve careful study.  So much poetry and freshness, so much fine sensibility in a harmonic vocabulary of a taste so exquisite that even the listeners least sympathetic to this kind sport were wont to comptemplate a second time the lone fir tree 'Lahore'."

Michel-Dimitri Calvocoressi summarized: "One of the great successes of the evening was for Maurice Delage's Quatre poèmes hindous, savoury and full of emotion, admirably performed ... The audience, charmed, called for an encore of the mélodies, and would gladly have had encores of the others.

Overview

Poems

1. Madras

2. Lahore

3. Bénarès

4. Jeypur

Music

The  are short, as are the poems Delage chose.  Even the longest amongst them, an anonymous story about the birth of Buddha, foolows a clear melodic line, hardly troubled by the diaereses placed under certain words ("mystéri-eux", "li-anes").  The prose also inspired the composer to attempt exotic rhythms, with a quintuple meter, the use of pizzicato harmonics on the strings, and colouring principles Ravel had used in his Chansons madécasses.

By placing the two Bhartṛhari stanzas at the beginning and the end of the cycle, Delage shows a concern for formal balance, which is translated musically by the return of a phrase given to the flute in the first and last bars of Quatre poèmes hindous, "in an entirely judicious manner", according to Flothuis:

"Lahore" stands out from the other mélodies, lasting nearly four minutes.  The Heine poem,subtly ironic in its parallel of the fir numbed with cold and the palm under the burning sun, allows Delage to evoke the Far East with luxurious arpeggios on the harp.  The end of the poem opens on a very pure, unaccompanied vocalization (bars 43 to 55 in the score) in which the singer must adjust her tessitura and sing à bouche fermée ("with mouth closed"), then bouche ouverte ("mouth open"), "closing the mouth bit by bit".  This novel effect stunned its first audiences.

The instrumental accompaniment is of great refinement.  According to Vuillermoz, "Mr. Delage is a veritable child of the 20th century, with the instinctive ease of his delectable handling of dissonance, his curiosity with rare timbres, his desire to push back sonic boundaries, his skillful annexation of neighbouring lands in the unexplored domains of noise.  His impatience with the yoke in the presence of the imperfections of our musical material is characteristic; he loosens the bow of his viola to B he invents a pizzicato-glissando which pulls from the string an almost human sob, he demands closed-mouth vocalizations from the female voice, and sometimes imposes on it a veiled nasal tone of an invisible mute, and all without a laborious strangeness, without bias, and virtually without searching."

Delage learned music by playing and improvising on his viola.  From this he got the pizzicato-glissando which, at the beginning of "Lahore", provides a "Hindu" colour, far from pastiche—and impossible to reproduce on piano.

Critical analysis

The reception of Quatre poèmes hindous was favourable overall, though not unanimously so.   expressed reservations over the work for its brevity and delicately transparent character: "I must admit that after hearing  Maurice Delage's Hindu mélodies, I was still waiting for the masterpiece announced! ... I will not dwell on these pieces, which are short but still too long for meagre musical interest they offer."  Such a negative criticism was isolated in 1914 but taken up by numerous critics of Delage's Sept haï-kaïs of 1925, which are even shorter.  Delage's music has thus acquired a reputation of being "preciocities" and "sound trinkets", the "breathless" work of an amateur music.  This is contradicted by his Contrerimes for piano (1927), which lasts 20 minutes, and especially his string quartet from 1949, which lasts nearly 55 minutes.

In 1960, Paul Pittion reviewed Delage's works, and wrote of the Quatre poèmes hindous: "Maurice Delage has produced little, but his mélodies, along with those of Henri Duparc, are masterworks of vocal and polyphonic composition, as well as of sensitivity."

Homages

In 1937, Georges Auric gave an account of his impression of the première performance a quarter century earlier: "While nothing is more easily intolerable than false exoticism and this tainted quaintness which has sickened us with its quite mediocre music, there is, under the prestige of an instrumentation of a rare subtlety, a very pure and deep feeling there".

According to Michel Duchesneau, the co-premières of the Quatre poèmes hindous, Ravel's Trois poèmes de Mallarmé, and Stravinsky's Three Japanese Lyrics at the SMI provoked "an evolution" of the French mélodie, understood as "chamber music with voice" until 1939.  In 1941, Charles Koechlin cited the cello's pizzicato-glissando (or pizz. vibrato molto) passage in his Traité de l'orchestration as a "characteristic example" of modern composition with pizzicato.

According to Michel Duchesneau, immediately after the work's première, Delage could still enjoy the esteem of the master Debussy, whose work had convinced him to devote himself to music.  According to Paul Landormy, "Debussy, taken with his Poèmes hindous, asked him one day to play them to him with the music under his eyes.  He nearly collapsed ..."

Notes

References

Works cited

 
 
 
 
 
 
 
 
 
 
 
 

Compositions by Maurice Delage
1912 compositions
Classical song cycles in French
Music based on poems